Hachim Ndiaye (born 28 October 1963) is a retired Senegalese sprinter who specialized in the 400 metres.

He is best known for finishing fourth in the 4 × 400 metres relay at the 1996 Olympic Games, together with Moustapha Diarra, Aboubakry Dia and Ibou Faye. The team ran in a Senegalese record.

Individually he won a bronze medal at the 1989 African Championships, a bronze medal at the 1989 Jeux de la Francophonie, and silver medals at the 1994 and 1997 Jeux de la Francophonie. He competed at the 1995 and 1997 World Championships without reaching the final.

His personal best time was 45.44 seconds (1994).

References

1963 births
Living people
Senegalese male sprinters
Athletes (track and field) at the 1996 Summer Olympics
Olympic athletes of Senegal